The Duchess of Newcastle or the Duchess of Newcastle-upon-Tyne usually refers to the wife or widow of a Duke of Newcastle. The dukedom became extinct in 1988.

Duchesses of Newcastle-on Tyne and Newcastle

1st creation (1665)
 Margaret Cavendish, Duchess of Newcastle-upon-Tyne (1623–1673) (née Margaret Lucas), English aristocrat, writer and scientist, 2nd wife of William Cavendish, 1st Duke of Newcastle
 Frances Pierrepoint (1630–1695), wife of Henry Cavendish, 2nd Duke of Newcastle

2nd creation (1694)
 Margaret Holles, Duchess of Newcastle-upon-Tyne (1661–1716) (née Margaret Cavendish), wife of John Holles, 1st Duke of Newcastle

3rd creation (1715)
 Harriet Pelham-Holles, Duchess of Newcastle-upon-Tyne (1701–1776) (Lady Harriet Godolphin), wife of Thomas Pelham-Holles, 1st Duke of Newcastle
 Catherine Pelham-Clinton, Countess of Lincoln (1727–1760), wife of Henry Pelham-Clinton, 2nd Duke of Newcastle
 Lady Anna Maria Stanhope, wife of Thomas Pelham-Clinton, 3rd Duke of Newcastle
 Georgiana Mundy (d.1822), wife of Henry Pelham-Clinton, 4th Duke of Newcastle
 Henrietta Hope, wife of Henry Pelham-Clinton, 6th Duke of Newcastle
 Kathleen Pelham-Clinton, Duchess of Newcastle (1872–1955) (née Kathleen Candy), conformation show judge and dog breeder, wife of Henry Pelham-Clinton, 7th Duke of Newcastle
 Olive Muriel Thompson, wife of Francis Pelham-Clinton-Hope, 8th Duke of Newcastle
 Lady Mary Montagu-Stuart-Wortley (1920–1997), 2nd wife of Henry Pelham-Clinton-Hope, 9th Duke of Newcastle
 Sally Ann Wemyss, 3rd wife of Henry Pelham-Clinton-Hope, 9th Duke of Newcastle